Winford Eason "Winnie" Baze (July 14, 1914 – December 30, 2006) was an American football back who played one season with the Philadelphia Eagles of the National Football League. He first enrolled at Schreiner Institute before transferring to Texas Technological College. He attended Robert Lee High School in Robert Lee, Texas.

References

External links
Just Sports Stats

1914 births
2006 deaths
Players of American football from Texas
American football running backs
American football defensive backs
Schreiner Mountaineers football players
Texas Tech Red Raiders football players
Philadelphia Eagles players
People from Coke County, Texas